The Witch Doctor is an album by American jazz drummer and bandleader Art Blakey and his group The Jazz Messengers recorded on March 14, 1961 and released on the Blue Note label. It features performances by Blakey with Lee Morgan, Wayne Shorter, Bobby Timmons, and Jymie Merritt.

Track listing 
 "The Witch Doctor" (Morgan) – 5:32
 "Afrique" (Morgan) – 6:58
 "Those Who Sit and Wait" (Shorter) – 5:54
 "A Little Busy" (Timmons) – 6:18
 "Joelle" (Shorter) – 5:13
 "Lost and Found" (Jordan) – 5:06
 "The Witch Doctor" [alternate take] (Morgan) – 5:33 Bonus track on CD

Personnel 
 Art Blakey – drums
 Lee Morgan – trumpet, flugelhorn
 Wayne Shorter – tenor saxophone
 Bobby Timmons – piano
 Jymie Merritt – bass

References

Art Blakey albums
The Jazz Messengers albums
1968 albums
Albums produced by Alfred Lion
Blue Note Records albums
Albums recorded at Van Gelder Studio